Onalaska is an unincorporated community and census-designated place (CDP) in Lewis County, Washington, United States. As of the 2010 census it had a population of 621. Onalaska is located along Washington State Route 508.

Etymology
The name for the community comes from the poem "The Pleasures of Hope" by Scottish poet Thomas Campbell. The towns of Onalaska in Washington, Arkansas, Texas, and Wisconsin share a linked history to one another through the lumber industry.

History 
Onalaska was built around the inland mill established by the Carlisle Lumber Company in 1909. At its peak in 1929, company inventory numbered over 20 million board feet of lumber — enough to stretch all the way to the Panama Canal.

The company's surviving 225-foot smokestack near Carlisle Lake was built approximately in 1920, and is the last trace of one of the most successful mid-sized sawmills in Washington state. In May 2021, the site was listed to the Washington Heritage Register by the Washington State Advisory Council on Historic Preservation.

The mill employed a sizeable number of Japanese and Japanese Americans. They lived north of today's State Route 508 and east of Carlisle Avenue. The streets, which ran parallel to Carlisle Avenue were called Oriental Avenue, Nippon Avenue and Tokyo Avenue.

According to Onalaska, a history of the Carlisle Lumber Company by Vic Kucera, the 1940 census showed 62 people of Japanese descent living in Lewis County. Because of their experience in the mill, the local Japanese Americans were forced to relocate to Camp Tulelake in California to help with its construction, Kucera writes. The Army relied on their labor to finish the camp where they were subsequently interned for the duration of WWII.

The Lewis County Museum in Chehalis has an exhibit honoring the Japanese and Japanese American internees.

In 2014, Governor Jay Inslee awarded $20,000 to Onalaska Wood Energy during his Climate Tour that year, and praised the company as “one of the leaders in biofuel technology.”  By 2020, the company had left 100,000 gallons of hazardous waste and in 2021 the EPA started an emergency $0.9 million cleanup, shipping the waste by truck and railroad to Idaho and Utah.

Geography
Onalaska is in west-central Lewis County, in the valley of the South Fork of the Newaukum River. State Route 508 passes through the community, leading west  to Napavine and east  to Morton.

The South Fork of the Newaukum forms the southern edge of the community, and Carlisle Lake is on the western edge. The Newaukum River flows west to the Chehalis River at Chehalis.

Arts and culture

Held for the first time in 2009, the Onalaska Apple Harvest Festival is an annual community celebration usually held in late September or early October.  Notable highlights of the event include an apple pie contest, a parade, farm tours, a community-wide church service, various cuisine options, high school alumni sporting competitions, canoe and kayak races, and a "royal court" bingo tournament. Profits and donations from the festival help fund community projects in Onalaska.

Government and politics

Politics

Onalaska is recognized as being majority Republican and conservative, similar in respects to other rural populations within Lewis County.

The results for the 2020 U.S. Presidential Election for the Onalaska voting district were as follows:

 Donald J. Trump (Republican) - 968 (70.35%)
 Joe Biden (Democrat) - 368 (26.74%)
 Jo Jorgensen (Libertarian) - 24 (1.74%)
 Howie Hawkins (Green) - 7 (0.51%)
 Other candidates - 1 (0.08%)
 Write-in candidate - 8 (0.58%)

Education
The Onalaska School District provides the community's education.

 Onalaska Elementary/Middle School is the community's public elementary/middle school
 Onalaska High School is the community's public high school

References

External links
Onalaska School District
Blogger - Onalaska Community Blog

Unincorporated communities in Lewis County, Washington
Unincorporated communities in Washington (state)
Census-designated places in Lewis County, Washington
Census-designated places in Washington (state)